Malomykolaivka may refer to the following places in Ukraine:

 Malomykolaivka, Dnipropetrovsk Oblast, village in Synelnykove Raion
 Malomykolaivka, Luhansk Oblast, urban-type settlement in Antratsyt Raion